The 1981 Peter Jackson Classic was contested from July 2–5 at Summerlea Golf & Country Club. It was the 9th edition of the Peter Jackson Classic, and the third edition as a major championship on the LPGA Tour.

This event was won by Jan Stephenson.

Final leaderboard

External links
 Golf Observer source

Canadian Women's Open
Peter Jackson Classic
Peter Jackson Classic
Peter Jackson Classic
Peter Jackson Classic